Lieutenant General Sir Warren Hastings Anderson  (9 January 1872 – 11 December 1930) was Quartermaster-General to the Forces.

Military career
Anderson was born the first son of General David Anderson, Colonel-in-Chief of the Cheshire Regiment, and his wife, Charlotte Christina (née Anderson). Educated at Marlborough College and the Royal Military College, Sandhurst, Anderson was commissioned into the Cheshire Regiment as a second lieutenant on 8 October 1890, and promoted to lieutenant on 9 January 1894.

He was promoted to captain on 18 December 1899, as he left for South Africa and the Second Boer War. Serving first in a staff position in 1900 as deputy assistant adjutant general on the staff of the military governor in Johannesburg, he returned to his regiment to become adjutant of the 2nd battalion on 21 April 1901. The battalion served in South Africa throughout the war, which ended in June 1902. Anderson returned home with other officers and men of the battalion on the SS St. Andrew leaving Cape Town in early October 1902, and was subsequently stationed at Aldershot.

He also took part in World War I, joining the British Expeditionary Force and serving with the 8th Division, then with the 11th Army Corps, then with the 15th Army Corps and finally with the 1st Army. He was, effectively Chief of Staff of the 1st Army and it was his task to prepare for the assault on Vimy Ridge in 1917.

After the war he became commandant at the Staff College in Camberley until 1922 when he moved to army headquarters in India. He was appointed General Officer Commanding Baluchistan District in 1924 and Quartermaster-General to the Forces in 1927.

He was colonel of the Cheshire Regiment from 1928 to 1930.

He died on 11 December 1930.

Family
Anderson was the older brother of Admiral Sir David Murray Anderson and married Eileen Hamilton in 1910; they had no children.

References

Bibliography
 Outline of the development of the British Army: Up to the commencement of the Great War, 1914 Notes for four lectures delivered at the Staff College by Lieutenant General Sir Hastings Anderson

|-
 

|-

1872 births
1930 deaths
Military personnel from Aldershot
British Army lieutenant generals
Cheshire Regiment officers
Knights Commander of the Order of the Bath
People educated at Marlborough College
British Army generals of World War I
British Army personnel of the Second Boer War
Commandants of the Staff College, Camberley
Graduates of the Royal Military College, Sandhurst
Military personnel from Surrey